Clifford Bay is a bay in the northeast of the South Island of New Zealand, in the Marlborough Region. It lies between Cloudy Bay to the northwest, and Cape Campbell. The bay's most notable feature is the solar salt extraction works at Lake Grassmere, close to the southern end of the bay.

Since the 1920s, there have been various proposals for an inter-island port and ferry terminal to replace Picton. However, such plans never proceeded beyond an investigation stage, often due to the capital costs.  In May 2011, plans were announced to revisit the development of a port at Clifford Bay, using a mix of private and public funding. Such a port would reduce both sailing time across the Cook Strait from Wellington and the surface distance to Christchurch. It would also allow ferries to operate at higher speeds than they can in the ecologically sensitive Marlborough Sounds and remove the steep grades on the railway line that leads out of Picton. 

While a new port at Clifford Bay would have affected the economy of Picton, there were positive options to refocus Picton as a tourist centre, and the gateway to the Marlborough Sounds.

In November 2013, the Government announced it would not be building a new port at Clifford Bay, putting an end to two years of speculation.

References

Bays of the Marlborough Region
Cook Strait